Sir Alexander Hargreaves Brown, 1st Baronet (11 April 1844 – 12 March 1922) was an English Liberal Party, and later Liberal Unionist, politician who sat in the House of Commons from 1868 to 1906.

Family

Brown was the third son of Alexander Brown, eldest son of Sir William Brown, 1st Baronet of Beilby Grange, Yorkshire and his wife Sarah Brown of New York. His nephew was The Viscount Ruffside, the WWII-era Speaker of the House of Commons.

Brown married Henrietta Agnes Terrell Blandy, fifth daughter of Charles Blandy of Madeira in 1876. Their eldest son Captain Gordon Hargreaves Brown was killed in action in the First World War. In 1910 Gordon Hargreaves Brown had married Edith Ivy Piggott, eldest daughter and co-heir of Admiral William Harvey Pigott. She assumed in 1925 the additional surname of Pigott for herself and her issue. Their son, the second Baronet, was killed in action in the Second World War.

Career

He served in the 5th Dragoon Guards from 1864 to 1866. He was honorary colonel of the Lancashire and Cheshire Royal Garrison Artillery and was J. P. for Lancashire and Surrey.

Politics
At the 1868 general election, Brown was elected unopposed as one of the two Members of Parliament (MPs) for the borough of Wenlock in Shropshire. He held the seat until it was abolished under the Redistribution of Seats Act 1885.

Brown was returned to the Commons at the 1885 general election as MP for the new Wellington division of Shropshire. He became a Liberal Unionist in 1886, and held the seat until he stood down at the 1906 general election.

Brown was created a Baronet of Broome Hall in Capel in the County of Surrey on 5 January 1903. He lived at Broome Hall Holmwood, Surrey and died at the age of 77.

Arms

Notes 

In the text above Broome Hall is situated in Holmwood, this is not accurate it is actually in Coldharbour in the parish of Capel.

References 
Kidd, Charles, Williamson, David (editors). Debrett's Peerage and Baronetage (1990 edition). New York: St Martin's Press, 1990,

External links 
 

1844 births
1922 deaths
Baronets in the Baronetage of the United Kingdom
Liberal Party (UK) MPs for English constituencies
UK MPs 1868–1874
UK MPs 1874–1880
UK MPs 1880–1885
UK MPs 1885–1886
UK MPs 1886–1892
UK MPs 1892–1895
UK MPs 1895–1900
UK MPs 1900–1906
5th Dragoon Guards officers
Liberal Unionist Party MPs for English constituencies
People from Holmwood